Tank: The M1A1 Abrams Battle Tank Simulation is a 1989 video game published by Spectrum HoloByte.

Gameplay
Tank is a game in which this armor simulation was the initial entry into the "Electronic Battlefield System".

Reception

M. Evan Brooks reviewed the game for Computer Gaming World, and stated that "Sadly, Tank has no infantry; both sides are armor heavy. This could well occur in rare instances, but the absence of infantry is sorely missed in what purports to be a simulation of the contemporary battlefield."

Paul Rigby for The Games Machine said that "Tank is an enjoyable simulation which benefits from a great deal of detailed research – the operation of the M1 Abrams is well portrayed, while the option of being able to control 16 tanks is exciting (and exhausting!)."

Steven Anzovin for Compute! said that "If you sigh wistfully for the great tank battles that may never be, Tank is definitely your game."

Reviews
ASM (Aktueller Software Markt) - Apr, 1990
Computer Gaming World - Jun, 1991

See also
M1 Tank Platoon

References

External links

1989 video games
DOS games
Games commercially released with DOSBox
Spectrum HoloByte games
Tank simulation video games
Video games developed in the United States